Yrjö Vilho Soini (17 July 1896 – 6 February 1975) was a Finnish journalist, novelist and playwright, who used the pen name Agapetus. His humorous works enjoyed wide popularity in Finland during the 20th century and several of them have been adapted into films.

Soini was born in Hattula, Tavastia Proper. His family included:

Children: Seppo, Elina and Irma Soini
Grandchildren include: Sakari, Ilkka and Lauri Soini
Grandgrandchildren: Alexander, Amanda and Silja Soini 

He died in Helsinki, aged 78.

Stage plays
1927: Olenko minä tullut haaremiin (film adaptation by Waldemar Wohlström in 1932 and by T. J. Särkkä in 1938) 
1930: Syntipukki (film adaptation by Erkki Karu in 1935 and by Matti Kassila in 1957)
1931: Kirjakaupassa
1932: Onnellinen Sakari (film adaptation in 1939 under the title Takki ja liivit pois! directed by Jorma Nortimo)
1934: Kaikenlaisia vieraita (film adaptation in  1936)
1951: Viisi vekkulia (film adaptation in  1956)

Novels

1922: Setä ja serkunpoika
1923: Viimeinen lautta
1925: Muuan sulhasmies (with a second edition in 1949)
1928: Aatamin puvussa ja vähän Eevankin (film adaptations in 1931, 1940, 1959 and 1971)
1929: Rovastin häämatkat (film adaptation under the title Rovastin häämatkat in 1931, directed by Jaakko Korhonen)
1931: Ei mitään selityksiä
1933: Totinen torvensoittaja (film adaptation in 1941)
1934: Jaarlin sisar (historical novel published under his real name Yrjö Soini)
1934: Kukkatarhassa
1935: Asessorin naishuolet (film adaptations in 1937 and 1958)
1936: Hilman päivät (film adaptation in 1954 under the title Hilmanpäivät)
1937: Pitäjänvaras
1946: Tulkaa meille
1955: Elämän valhe
1957: Musta kissa
1962: Kaikkien pappien täti
1967: Vanha frakki

Other works / Books
1931: 
1950: Helsingin poika, 1950 (biography of J. A. Ehrenström)
1956: Kuin Pietari hiilivalkealla – Sotasyyllisyysasian vaiheet 1944−1949
1960: Kuulovartiossa
1963: Vieraanvaraisuus ammattina – kulttuurihistoriallinen katsaus Suomen majoitus- ja ravitsemuselinkeinon kehitykseen I−II
1965: Kalkki-Petteri, 1965 (biography of Petter Forsström)
1968: Toinen näytös – entä kolmas? – Sotasyyllisyysasian myöhemmät vaiheet
1974: Haikon kartano vuosisatojen saatossa 1362−1966

External links
Biografiskt Lexicon Finland: Yrjö Soini biography page

1896 births
1975 deaths
People from Hattula
People from Häme Province (Grand Duchy of Finland)
Writers from Kanta-Häme
20th-century Finnish novelists